Ronde van Nederland 1992 was a cycling race held in the Netherlands, and it was the 32nd such race and held from August 17 to August 22, 1992. The race started in Zoetermeer (South Holland) and finished in Gulpen (Limburg).

Stages

17-08-1992: Zoetermeer-Zoetermeer (Prologue), 5.6 km

18-08-1992: Nijkerk-Veendam, 203.5 km

19-08-1992: Hardenberg-Haaksbergen, 93 km

19-08-1992: Haaksbergen-Haaksbergen (Time Trial), 31 km

20-08-1992: Arnhem-Tilburg, 163.5 km

21-08-1992: Tilburg-Heythuysen, 183 km

22-08-1992: Heythuysen-Gulpen, 176 km

Final classification

External links
Wielersite Results

Ronde van Nederland
August 1992 sports events in Europe
1992 in road cycling
1992 in Dutch sport